This is a list of communities in Bainbridge Island, Washington.

 Agate Point
 Allen Cove
 Arrow Point
 Azalea
 Bainbridge Grange
 Battle Point
 Bill Point
 Blakely
 Blue Heron
 Creosote
 Crystal Springs
 Eagledale
 Ferncliff
 Finch
 Fletcher Bay
 Fort Ward
 Hawley
 Hidden Cove
 Island Center
 Liberty
 Lovgren
 Lynwood Center
 Madrona Heights
 Manitou Beach
 Manzanita
 New Brooklyn
 Point Monroe
 Point White
 Port Blakely
 Port Madison
 Restoration Point
 Rolling Bay
 Seabold
 South Beach
 Tolo
 Torvanger
 Venice
 West Blakely
 West Port Madison
 Westwood
 Wing Point
 Winslow
 Yeomalt